Tatum is a city in Panola and Rusk counties in the U.S. state of Texas. The population was 1,342 at the 2020 census.

History
Tatum was settled in the 1840s by Albert Tatum and his second wife, Mary C. (Rippetoe) Tatum. In 1848, they built a large plantation there. In 1885, the Santa Fe Railway came through, and the town was divided into individual lots. One of their sons, Paul "Uncle Fox" Tatum, who studied architecture in New York, laid out the streets. He became the postmaster in 1886. The city of Tatum lies along Trammel's Trace, an old trade route. A marker at the south end of town commemorates it. In the city park stands the restored Santa Fe depot.

Albert Tatum was born on August 12, 1810, in Hancock County, Georgia, the son of William Tatum and Alice B. (Dent) Tatum. Albert Tatum first married Rebecca Elizabeth Ann Menefee about 1837 in Chambers County, Alabama. They were the parents of one son, William C. Tatum, who was born on June 25, 1838, in Chambers County, Alabama.

After the death of his first wife on December 31, 1840, in Chambers County, Alabama,  Albert Tatum married Mary C. Rippetoe on September 22, 1841, in Tallapoosa County, Alabama.

After the town's first bank was established in 1903, things got bad early in the 20th century as a tornado destroyed part of the town in 1904. The next year, a fire destroyed almost all of the north side of town.

Geography

Tatum is located at  (32.314853, –94.518875).

Major highways

  State Highway 43
  State Highway 149

Climate

The climate in this area is characterized by hot, humid summers and generally mild to cool winters.  According to the Köppen climate classification, Tatum has a humid subtropical climate, Cfa on climate maps.

Demographics

As of the 2020 United States census, there were 1,342 people, 494 households, and 320 families residing in the city.

As of the census of 2000,  1,175 people, 459 households, and 324 families resided in the city. The population density was 309.9 people per square mile (119.7/km). The 523 housing units averaged 137.9/sq mi (53.3/km). The racial makeup of the city was 73.62% White, 16.43% African American, 0.51% Native American, 0.09% Pacific Islander, 7.15% from other races, and 2.21% from two or more races. Hispanics or Latinos of any race were 17.62% of the population.

Of the 459 households, 35.3% had children under the age of 18 living with them, 52.1% were married couples living together, 13.5% had a female householder with no husband present, and 29.4% were not families. About 27.5% of all households were made up of individuals, and 13.9% had someone living alone who was 65 years of age or older. The average household size was 2.56 and the average family size was 3.14.

In the city, the population was distributed as 28.9% under the age of 18, 10.0% from 18 to 24, 27.3% from 25 to 44, 21.3% from 45 to 64, and 12.5% who were 65 years of age or older. The median age was 33 years. For every 100 females, there were 90.4 males. For every 100 females age 18 and over, there were 84.7 males.

The median income for a household in the city was $25,000, and for a family was $30,119. Males had a median income of $26,719 versus $19,063 for females. The per capita income for the city was $13,181. About 20.4% of families and 25.4% of the population were below the poverty line, including 34.8% of those under age 18 and 20.2% of those age 65 or over.

Education
The City of Tatum is served by the Tatum Independent School District.  A very small portion of the town is also within the Beckville ISD.

Attractions
The park was deeded to the Texas Parks and Wildlife Department by Texas Utilities and opened to the public in 1976. The park is located on  Martin Creek Lake, constructed to provide cooling water for the lignite-fired Martin Lake Power Plant. Martin Creek Lake State Park provides excellent, year round fishing, camping, wildlife observation and photography, picnicking, boating, water skiing, unsupervised lake swimming, backpacking, and hiking. Annual events at Martin Creek Lake State Park include: Christmas in the Piney Woods (first weekend in December), Fourth of July Bike Parade, and the Annual Family Easter Egg Hunt. The park also offers regular programs most weekends including, Geocaching 101, Dutch Oven Cooking (4th Saturday of every month), Guided Hikes, Guided Paddling Programs, Star Gazing, and Art in the Parks craft programs.

Notable people

 Bob Allen, former pitcher for the Cleveland Indians
 Larry Centers, NFL running back
 Denarius Moore, Oakland Raiders wide receiver 
 Crystal Powell, actress and comedienne

References

External links
 Tatum Economic Development Corporation
 Tatum Independent School District

Cities in Rusk County, Texas
Cities in Panola County, Texas
Cities in Texas
Longview metropolitan area, Texas